286 may refer to:

The year 286
286 (number)
Intel 80286, a microprocessor
2-8-6, a locomotive wheel arrangement
286, Southampton, a building